Swimming at the 2019 World Aquatics Championships was held from 21 to 28 July 2019.

Schedule
42 events were held.

All times are local (UTC+9).

Medal summary

Medal table

Men

 Swimmers who participated in the heats only and received medals.

Women

 Swimmers who participated in the heats only and received medals.

Mixed

 Swimmers who participated in the heats only and received medals.

Doping
Days before the competition, 20-year-old Australian swimmer Shayna Jack withdrew from the World Championships, mentioning “personal reasons”. On 27 July 2019, Jack published a statement on her social media profiles, confirming doping allegations over testing positive for a banned substance.

Records
The following world and championship records were broken during the competition.

World records

Championship records

References

External links
Official website

 
Swimming
Swimming at the World Aquatics Championships
World Aquatics Championships
Swimming competitions in South Korea